The International Conference on Theoretical, Applied, Computational and Experimental Mechanics (ICTACEM) is a professional organization for the field of Engineering. The ICTACEM was founded by (Late) Prof. P.K. Sinha of Department of Aerospace Engineering, Indian Institute of Technology Kharagpur as Conference on Theoritical applied, Computation and experimental mechanics(CTACEM) in 1998, which was later dignified as ICTACEM in 2001. 
The first International conference was held on December 1, 1998.

Since then, the organisation has constituted more than 250 committee members and delegates, all over the world.
The conference has been organised every three years since the inaugural in 1998.
The conference is known for addressing a major-scale of renowned Scientist, Astronauts, Researchers and Professors throughout the world.

Conference Themes 
ICTACEM 2017 [10]

Fluid Mechanics, Solid Mechanics, Flight Mechanics & Control, Propulsion [11]

References

External links
 
 

1998 conferences
International conferences in India
Aerospace engineering organizations
Indian engineering organisations
International professional associations
Professional associations based in India
International conferences